The Maschinenbauanstalt Übigau was a German engineering firm based in the present-day district of Übigau in the city of Dresden, Germany.

History 
In 1836 an engineering establishment was set up directly south of Übigau House (Schloss Übigau) by high school professor, 
Andreas Schubert, which in 1837 built the first Saxon passenger steamship, the Königin Maria as well as the first German-built locomotive, the Saxonia. The production of locomotives was stopped in 1840 after a second unit Phoenix, however the production of steam boilers continued.

In 1863 the Schlick'sche shipyard emerged here, a company that from 1877 as Kette A.G. became the most important German inland shipyard for barges and passenger ships. In 1892 it was joined by the shipbuilding research department of TU Dresden and by 1920 the Dresdner Maschinenfabrik und Schiffswerft Übigau had 1,500 employees. Apart from ships it also made boilers, large engines and dredgers. By 1930, when it had to close for 5 years as a result of the worldwide economic crisis, it had delivered 1,400 ships from its slipways to places as far away as Africa and South America.

In 1945 the firm was totally destroyed; it later reformed as VEB Dampfkesselbau Übigau, building boiler systems for large ships until the 1990s, and vehicle cranes as well from its privatisation in 1990 until its insolvency in 2001 . The yard had its own shipping berth with 48 steamers and cargo ships.

External links 
 Übigau Shipyard 1863-2001, photos and passenger steamer Dresden in 1926
 There is an English-language German railway forum at Railways of Germany

Transport in Saxony
Defunct locomotive manufacturers of Germany